This is a list of fictional characters that appear in the novel, films, and other related media that feature the character Stuart Little. These include the original 1945 Stuart Little novel by E. B. White, the 1999 film adaptation of the novel, Stuart Little, the 2002 sequel, Stuart Little 2, the 2003 animated series, Stuart Little, and the 2005 direct-to-video sequel, Stuart Little 3: Call of the Wild.

The Little family
Stuart Little (voiced by Michael J. Fox in the films and by David Kaufman in the animated series) is the titular main character. He is a young  anthropomorphic mouse. He is a member of the Little family living in New York City in 1945.  Although Stuart's age is never stated he has the mind and personality of an adolescent child. Critics have compared Stuart's life as a mouse entering a human world to that of an adolescent moving toward adulthood; which means that he is probably in his late teens or early 20s. Others see Stuart as giving children an empowering model of a small hero in a big world. The novel presents Stuart as being born to human parents which some found problematic. The first film has Stuart adopted from an orphanage after the accidental death of his birth parents.
George Little (portrayed by Jonathan Lipnicki in the first two films, and voiced by Myles Jeffrey in the animated series and by Corey Padnos in Stuart Little 3: Call of the Wild) is the eldest son of Eleanor and Frederick Little. George enjoys making friends and hanging out with his brother Stuart. His interests include toy models, racing model boats, and video games. In the first film, George was excited at first about having a little brother until he found that his parents had adopted a mouse. He ignored Stuart until they played together with some of George's models, after which George became appreciative and defensive of Stuart. He fights a bully named Anton for insulting Stuart, and instigates a search party when the police fail to bring Stuart home. In Stuart Little 3: Call of the Wild, George is seen playing a handheld video game and develops a crush on Brooke, a Lake Scout at Lake Garland. George joins the Scouts to be close to Brooke.

Frederick C. Little (also known as Mr. Little) (portrayed and voiced by Hugh Laurie) is the hardworking and friendly father of Stuart, George, and Martha, and husband of Eleanor. He works at the New York Museum of Natural History and plays piano. Frederick is supportive of his family, encouraging Stuart to see the bright side of bad situations and telling him the importance of perseverance. He tries to get his wife to let Stuart do physical activities despite her fears for his safety. In Stuart Little 3: Call of the Wild, when Eleanor refuses to let Stuart enroll in the Scouts due to his small stature, Frederick chips in saying it might do him some good, he was a Scout himself, and that he will watch out for him. Frederick volunteers himself to be in the Scouts as an assistant to Troopmaster Bickle. He also helps his wife remodel their cabin. In the 1945 novel, his middle initial was revealed to be "C." It is unknown what the C. stands for, and his middle initial was never used in any of the Stuart Little films or in the animated series.
Eleanor Little (also known as Mrs. Little) (portrayed by Geena Davis in the films and voiced by Jennifer Hale in the animated series) is the mother to Stuart and his siblings, and wife of Frederick Little. She is a loving mother and can sometimes be overprotective of Stuart. Eleanor gave birth to Martha sometime after the events of the first film, and the DVD commentary for Stuart Little 2 reveals that she is a music teacher at Stuart and George's school. She demonstrates DIY skills in Stuart Little 3: Call of the Wild when she makes improvements to the family's lakeside cabin. Her first name was revealed in the 1999 film, as it was never mentioned in the 1945 novel. In the 1945 novel, she was referred to as Mrs. Frederick C. Little.
Snowbell (voiced by Nathan Lane in the first two films, Quinton Flynn and Kevin Schon in the animated series and Stuart Little 3: Call of the Wild) is the Little family's Persian cat and a former member of Smokey's alley cat gang. Snowbell is lovable, selfish, cowardly, and shallow. He has been in the family longer than Stuart and Martha. George, Eleanor, and Frederick are all oblivious to the fact that he can talk while Stuart is aware that he can talk.  In the first film, Snowbell is jealous of Stuart and plots to get rid of him. He considers eating him but cannot as Stuart is a member of the family. Mrs. Little tells Snowbell that if he is ever caught eating Stuart, he is going outside permanently and can never again come back into the house. He tries to keep Stuart's existence secret from the alley cats because they will try to eat him and because their "mouse with a pet cat" relationship is an embarrassment. When the alley cats discover and hunt Stuart, Snowbell has a change of heart and defends him. Stuart returns the favor and they become friendly. In Stuart Little 2, Snowbell reluctantly helps Stuart look for Margalo, whom he has taken a dislike to, when she mysteriously disappears. Later, having found Margalo, he is upset and therefore very emotional at her departure. Snowbell has further adventures camping in Stuart Little 3: Call of the Wild, until he is eventually kidnapped by a mysterious beast.
Martha Little (portrayed by Anna and Ashley Hoelck in the second film and voiced by Jennifer Hale in the animated series) is the infant daughter of the family. Her character was created specifically for the film series and does not appear in the original novel. She is very messy and curious about the world. In Stuart Little 2, Martha says her first words. In the animated series, Martha speaks more, but still sometimes gibbers. In Stuart Little 3: Call of the Wild, her only speaking is babbles and a single line.

1945 novel
Dr. Paul Carey is a New York dentist who only appeared in the 1945 novel. He is a kind dentist who loves his patients, and a friend of Stuart's. His hobby is boat racing, and is the owner of the schooner Wasp, that Stuart thought "seemed to him finer and prouder than any other." He gave Stuart a tiny car when Stuart told him that he was travelling on foot to find Margalo.
Harriet Ames is a girl of about Stuart's height and age. She is said to be one of the best-dressed girls in New York City, with clothes that are especially tailored just for her. Harriet is also said to come from a rich family. In the 1945 novel, Stuart invites Harriet to go on a date with him in a miniature canoe, but discovers that it has been played with by the local children when they arrive.

LeRoy is a fat, lazy 12-year-old boy who is the owner of the Lillian B. Womwrath, a model sailboat which always managed to beat the other competitors in the Central Park boat race in the novel. He convinced Stuart to man his boat for him in exchange for a peanut butter and jelly sandwich and his own radio, but Stuart turned down the offer. Stuart managed to beat his boat in the race by losing it in a thunderstorm. LeRoy does not appear in any of the film adaptations of the novel; as his character was most likely replaced by Anton in the first film as both characters own a Lillian B. Womrath.
Margalo (voiced by Melanie Griffith in the second film and by Kathy Najimy in the animated series) is a young anthropomorphic canary, one of Stuart's closest friends, and his love interest. She is kind and free-spirited and always there for the people she loves. Her mother died when she was just a baby and she was pulled from the gutter by Falcon. In the 1945 novel, Eleanor adopted Margalo. Stuart becomes more infatuated with her the longer she stays. She saves Stuart's life when he stumbles onto a garbage barge, and is warned of Snowbell's plot to eat her and flies away from the Littles'. In Stuart Little 2, Margalo was taken in by the Falcon, who raised her to steal Eleanor's two karat ring. Margalo befriends Stuart, leaves Falcon, and gives Eleanor's ring back. In the animated series, Margalo is a recurring character who sometimes visits the Littles.
Miss Gunderson was a character in the original Stuart Little novel who was mentioned, but never seen. She was the teacher at the local schoolhouse who was unable to teach her students due to being ill. A similar teacher character makes a brief appearance in Stuart Little 2, portrayed by actress Maria Bamford. However, this character is unnamed, and has Stuart and George in her class, unlike the book counterpart.
The Angora Cat was an unnamed female Turkish Angora cat who lived in a tool shed in a small park near the Littles' house after escaping from a cage in a pet shop. Snowbell formulated a plan with the Angora Cat that would allow Snowbell to eat Margalo.
Edward Clydesdale is one of Dr. Paul Carey's patients who suggested where Stuart should look for Margalo. Most of his dialogue is barely understandable due to his teeth still being worked on as he was talking to Stuart.
Dr. Beechwood (portrayed by Dabney Coleman) is a doctor in the novel who came to the Littles' house to take Stuart's temperature after Eleanor accidentally left him in the washing machine. Dr. Beechwood had a small role in the 1999 film just like he did in the novel.

1999 film
 Monty (voiced by Steve Zahn in the first two films, André Sogliuzzo in the animated series and Rino Romano in Stuart Little 3: Call of the Wild) is a gray tabby cat, Snowbell's best friend and a former member of Smokey's alley cat gang. He is an original character introduced for the film series. Monty is shown to be unintelligent and somewhat of a blabbermouth, earning him the nickname, "Monty the Mouth". Being an alley cat, he has vast knowledge of the various streets and alleyways of New York City. His personal goal throughout the series is to cure his hunger, which involves him attempting to eat Stuart or digging for scraps in the city. His catchphrase is "Pleeeeease?", which is commonly used when he's begging for food or something he personally desires.
 Uncle Crenshaw Little (portrayed and voiced by Jeffrey Jones) is the brother of Frederick and Stretch Little and the uncle of Stuart, George, and Martha Little. Crenshaw first appeared in the first film as he attended the Little family reunion for Stuart's arrival into the family. He later returned as a supporting character in the animated series where it is revealed he has bought a farm, which Stuart and his family visit in the episode "A Little Bit Country", as well as a hotel that was thought to be haunted in the episode "A Little Vacation". He was also mentioned in Stuart Little 2 during a conversation between Eleanor and Frederick in which Frederick mentions that Uncle Crenshaw's kids never stop growing.
 Smokey (voiced by Chazz Palminteri) is a sadistic and intelligent Russian Blue cat who is the main antagonist of the first film and the leader of the alley cats. He came up with the plan to kill Stuart after Snowbell and Monty summoned him. Smokey was defeated by Stuart at the end of the film when he knocked him out of a tree, causing him to be chased away by a horde of dogs.
 Lucky (voiced by Jim Doughan) is a Siamese cat who is also one of Smokey's henchcats.
 Red (voiced by David Alan Grier) is a ginger American Shorthair tomcat (which is how he got his name) and one of Smokey's henchcats. He is believed to be the idiot of his gang considering he tends to forget Stuart's name, since he doesn't know Stuart very well.
 Mr. Reginald Stout (voiced by Bruno Kirby) is Stuart's fake father and the husband of Camille Stout. He and his wife live on a golf course. They were both forced by Smokey and his henchcats to pose as Stuart's supposedly long-lost parents as part of his plan. In the 2005 video game Stuart Little 3: Big Photo Adventure, it is shown that Reginald is an expert golfer and that has many trophies.
 Mrs. Camille Stout (voiced by Jennifer Tilly) is Stuart's fake mother and the wife of Reginald Stout. Although she and her husband were forced to pose as Stuart's long-lost parents, she tends to care for Stuart as if he was her own son and eventually reveals to him, along with Reginald, about Smokey's plans and urge him to flee. Camille reappeared in the 2001 video game Stuart Little: The Journey Home for the Game Boy Color along with her husband Reginald in a driving stage.
 Anton Gartman (portrayed by Miles Marsico) is a mean-spirited child who bullied George in the first film.  Anton tried to cheat his way to victory in the boat race by knocking out the other contestants. He appears to be very passionate about boat racing despite his young age, and he is depicted as being rude, inconsiderate, and overly competitive.
 Detective Sherman (portrayed by Jon Polito) is a police detective who works for the New York Police Department, organizing the investigation into Stuart's kidnapping.
 Detective Phil Allen (portrayed by Jim Doughan) is Detective Sherman's partner.
 Mrs. Keeper (portrayed by Julia Sweeney) is the head of the New York City Public Orphanage where Stuart was raised. She is a kind woman who happily watches over the orphans there.
 Aunt Tina Little (portrayed by Connie Ray) is one of Stuart, George and Martha's aunts and one of Frederick's sisters.
 Aunt Beatrice Little (portrayed by Allyce Beasley) is one of Stuart, George, and Martha's two aunts and Frederick's second sister.
 Cousin Edgar Little (portrayed by Brian Doyle-Murray) is Frederick Little's cousin, as well as the nephew of Grandma Estelle Little and Grandpa Spencer Little.
 Grandma Estelle Little (portrayed by Estelle Getty) is the grandmother of Stuart, George and Martha Little as well as the mother of Frederick Little.
 Grandpa Spencer Little (portrayed by Harold Gould) is the grandfather of Stuart, George and Martha Little as well as the father of Frederick Little.
 Uncle Stretch Little (portrayed by Patrick Thomas O'Brien) is the second uncle of Stuart, George and Martha Little as well as the second brother of Frederick Little.

Stuart Little 2
The Falcon (voiced by James Woods in the second film and by Pat Fraley in the animated series) is a sadistic, greedy peregrine falcon who is Margalo's former boss and the film's only antagonist. He is an evil, mysterious, and power-hungry falcon who has a threatening, abusive personality towards Margalo. He took Margalo in when she was young and raised her to be his personal slave, forcing her to steal various objects, including Mrs. Little's wedding ring. The Falcon returned in the animated series in the episode "A Little Bit Country", determined to get revenge on Stuart. During the production of Stuart Little 2, when the only antagonist was decided to be a bird, the animators researched a number of different predatorial birds including Eagles and Hawks. The peregrine falcon was ultimately decided due to its villainous postures. Early designs of the Falcon originally had him walking on both feet in an anthropomorphic fashion while wearing a necklace beaded with the valuables he had initially stolen.
Will Wilson (portrayed and voiced by Marc John Jefferies) is George's loyal best friend who was introduced in Stuart Little 2 and later reappeared in the episode, "He Said He Said" of the animated series.
The Coach (portrayed by Jim Doughan) is George and Stuart's soccer coach.
Wallace (portrayed by Angelo Massagli) is George's second bully who picked on him on the soccer field. He was kicked in the face with a soccer ball by George during the final moments of the game as a result of his tormenting.
Irwin (portrayed by Kevin Olson) is one of George's fellow soccer players. During George's soccer game, he was injured in the stomach after being hit by a soccer ball. His injury prompted the coach to let Stuart join the game and fill in for him, as Stuart sat on the bench for most of the game.
Tony (portrayed by Bobby Walsh) is one of George and Stuart's classmates. He takes karate lessons.
Mark (portrayed by Michael C. Fuchs) is another one of George and Stuart's classmates. He takes guitar lessons.
Rob (portrayed by Brad Garrett) was the plumber that came to the Littles' house to find Eleanor's ring after she thought it had fallen down the drain.
Rita Wilson (portrayed by Amelia Marshall) is the mother of Will. She has a minor role in Stuart Little 2, in which she speaks to Eleanor when she approaches her doorstep to pick up Stuart and George, only to find out Stuart isn't there.
An unnamed Indian-American taxi driver (portrayed by Ronobir Lahiri) drives the Little family around the city in search of Stuart. A phrase that he tends to say is "Okey-dokey, no problem!"

Animated series
Rick Ruckus (voiced by Matt Kaminsky) is a pro skater whom George and Stuart are big fans of.
Butch (vocal effects by Dee Bradley Baker) is a dog who lives in the same neighborhood as the Littles. In the episode "The Meatloaf Bandit", George and Stuart attempted to train him as their watchdog against the Meatloaf Bandit. His owner, Mr. Brown, was never seen.
Larry Gronk (voiced by Daniel Hansen) is a student who attends George, Stuart and Will's school. In the episode "Life, Liberty and the Pursuit of Taco Tuesday", he ran for the position of Class Officer, but his campaign was unintentionally sabotaged by Stuart, George, and Will. After a couple of failed attempts to push their efforts back, Larry eventually admits that he only ran to get out of gym class early and favors a vote for Stuart. Hansen previously portrayed an unnamed student in Stuart Little 2.
Ginger (voiced by Julie Nathanson) is a female cat whom Snowbell develops a crush on in the episode "A Little Too Fast". His attempts at meeting her are foiled by George, but near the end of the episode, they meet up and plan a date.
The Crows (both voiced by Jeff Bennett) are a trio of crows who served as Falcon's henchmen in the episode "A Little Bit Country".
Scar (voiced by Michael Chiklis) and Tiger (voiced by Mark Hamill) are two cats who are the main antagonists in the episode "No Job is Too Little". They are both old friends of Monty. Upon seeing Stuart and George delivering bags of food from a deli, they hatch a plan to ambush them and take the food for themselves. They both come close to stealing them, along with eating Stuart, but are thwarted by Snowbell.

Stuart Little 3: Call of the Wild
 Reeko (voiced by Wayne Brady) is a smooth-talking anthropomorphic skunk who befriends Stuart. Reeko is described by the forest animals as being selfish, lazy, greedy, and rude. He is mostly seen throughout the film trying to find a way to give food to a ferocious puma called the "Beast". When he met Stuart, he was only interested in what kinds of food he could give him that he could offer to the Beast, but thinks differently when Stuart deems him as a friend and watches him sacrifice himself to save Snowbell from the Beast. At the end of the film, Reeko and Stuart give each other a hug as a sign of their friendship, and Stuart's family drives home.
 The Beast (voiced by Virginia Madsen) is a ferocious and ruthless female puma and the film's main antagonist. She resides in a cave on the other side of the forest, and every night, terrorizes the animals of the forest into bringing her food as part of a tribute to herself. She forced Reeko in particular to also bring her food, most likely due to him being late in doing so and plotted to make a rug out of Snowbell's fur. She is defeated when she falls into Stuart and Snowbell's trap.
 Brooke (voiced by Tara Strong) is an experienced Lake Scout at Lake Garland who is George's love interest.
 Troopmaster Bickle (voiced by Peter MacNicol) is the slightly overweight, clumsy yet well-intentioned leader of the Lake Scouts. Bickle appears to be inexperienced when it comes to leading the Scouts as he sometimes uses incorrect words (for example, "skull assessment test" instead of "skill assessment test"), and occasionally gets himself hurt. Despite this, he is a kind man who always tries to do a good job leading them.
 Beaver (voiced by Charlie Adler) is one of the animals of the forest who appears to hate Reeko. His opinion of him changes when Reeko risks his life to save Stuart.
 Cottontail (voiced by Kath Soucie) is a rabbit who is one of the animals of the forest who also appears to hate Reeko.
 Elwin is an overweight child who is one of the Lake Scouts at Lake Garland. He does not have a speaking role in the film. He is shown to be very physically fit despite his weight.

References

Little, Stuart
Stuart Little (franchise)
Stuart Little